Hidden Valleys is a name, coined in 2004, used to describe an area of interesting historical and scenic value between the city of Nottingham and the town of Mansfield in the English ceremonial county of Nottinghamshire. Promotional literature and tourist information for the Hidden Valleys were created to encourage tourism in an area that had been blighted by industrial decline. Partners in the project were: Ashfield District Council; Gedling Borough Council; the East Midlands Development Agency; Nottinghamshire County Council; and the Coalfields Regeneration Trust. It was intended by the partners that the name would help the Ashfield area compete with the Peak District and Sherwood Forest.

Notable residents

The area boasts links with the poet Lord Byron, his daughter Ada Lovelace, the romantic novelist D. H. Lawrence, bodyline fast bowlers Harold Larwood and Bill Voce and the composer Eric Coates as well as links to the legend of Robin Hood.

Notable buildings
Annesley Hall, Nottinghamshire and Newstead Abbey are two stately homes within the area. Historical religious buildings include: Felley Priory; St. Helen's Church in Selston, one of the county's oldest churches; and the Church of St. Mary Magdalene, Hucknall, the resting place of the Byron family and home to a fine collection of stained glass by the acclaimed artist Charles Eamer Kempe.

Papplewick Pumping Station is a fine example of a Victorian waterworks and houses an industrial museum. Bestwood Pumping Station is nearby.

The D. H. Lawrence Birthplace Museum is located in Eastwood.

See also
The Dukeries

References
 

Populated places in Nottinghamshire